The external anal sphincter  (or sphincter ani externus ) is a flat plane of skeletal muscle fibers, elliptical in shape and intimately adherent to the skin surrounding the margin of the anus.

Anatomy
The external anal sphincter measures about 8 to 10 cm in length, from its anterior to its posterior extremity, and is about 2.5 cm opposite the anus, the sphincter muscle retracts on defecating.

It consists of two layers: superficial and deep.

 The superficial layer, constitutes the main portion of the muscle, and arises from a narrow tendinous band, the anococcygeal raphe, which stretches from the tip of the coccyx to the posterior margin of the anus; it forms two flattened planes of muscular tissue, which encircle the anus and meet in front to be inserted into the central tendinous point of the perineum, joining with the superficial transverse perineal muscle, the levator ani, and the bulbospongiosus muscle also known as the bulbocavernosus.
 The deeper layer forms a complete sphincter to the anal canal. Its fibers surround the canal, closely applied to the internal anal sphincter, and in front blend with the other muscles at the central point of the perineum.

In a considerable proportion of cases the fibers decussate in front of the anus, and are continuous with the superficial transverse perineal muscle.

Posteriorly, they are not attached to the coccyx, but are continuous with those of the opposite side behind the anal canal.

The upper edge of the muscle is ill-defined, since fibers are given off from it to join the levator ani.

Actions
(1) Like other muscles, it is always in a state of tonic contraction, and having no antagonistic muscle it keeps the anal canal and orifice shut.

(2) It can be put into a condition of greater contraction under the influence of the will, so as more firmly to occlude the anal aperture, in expiratory efforts unconnected with defecation.

(3) Taking its fixed point at the coccyx, it helps to fix the central point of the perineum, so that the bulbospongiosus muscle may act from this fixed point.

Additional images

See also
Internal anal sphincter
Puborectalis muscle

References

External links
  - "The Male Perineum and the Penis: The External Anal Sphincter"
 
 

Perineum
Anus
Muscular system